Sugamuxi (died 1539) was the last iraca; cacique of the sacred City of the Sun Suamox. Sugamuxi, presently called Sogamoso, was an important city in the religion of the Muisca who inhabited the Altiplano Cundiboyacense in the times before the Spanish conquistadors reached the central highlands of the Colombian Andes. Fellow Muisca rulers of other territories within the Muisca Confederation were Tundama in Tundama, zaque Aquiminzaque in Hunza and zipa Sagipa in Bacatá.

Biography 

Sugamuxi was the successor of Nompanim, as cacique of Suamox. After the bloody confrontation of the zaque Quemuenchatocha and zipa Nemequene, Sugamuxi decided to stay neutral and in favour of peace between the two ever battling parts of the Muisca Confederation. The seat of Sugamuxi was the Sun Temple in Sogamoso, that was destroyed by soldiers of Gonzalo Jiménez de Quesada in September 1537.

At the arrival of the Spanish conquerors, Sugamuxi converted to catholicism and was called Don Alonso. He died shortly  afterwards.

Sugamuxi in Muisca history

See also 

 Spanish conquest of the Muisca
 Sun Temple, iraca

References 

Muisca rulers
1539 deaths
Year of birth unknown
16th century in Colombia
People from Sogamoso